The IPL (Indian Premier League) is a cricket league in India.

IPL may also refer to:

Sport 
Indonesian Premier League, a football league from 2011 to 2013
 Indoor Professional League, an indoor soccer league
 Iran Pro League or Persian Gulf Pro League, a football league
 Irish Premier League or NIFL Premiership, a Northern Irish football league
 Israeli Premier League, a football league

Computing 
 IBM Public License, an open-source software license
 Initial Program Load or Initial Program Loader
 Information Processing Language, a programming language
 Interrupt priority level, a part of the current system interrupt state

Institutes 
 Institut polytechnique de Lyon, a French research university of engineering schools in Lyon
 Instituto Politécnico de Leiria, a technical institute in Leiria, Portugal
 Instituto Politécnico de Lisboa, a technical institute in Lisbon, Portugal
 Instituto Politécnico Loyola, a technical institute in San Cristóbal, Dominican Republic

Business 
 AES Indiana, an electric utility company in Indianapolis, Indiana, formerly named Indianapolis Power & Light and IPL Power
 Interstate Power and Light, a subsidiary of Alliant Energy in Iowa
 IPL Information Processing Limited, a European consultancy company
 Infiniti Performance Line, the performance division of Infiniti

Other uses 
 IGN Pro League, an electronics sports league
 India pale lager, a style of beer
 Inferior parietal lobule, a part of the brain
 Intellectual property law
 Intense pulsed light, a cosmetic and medical treatment
 Internet Public Library, a non-profit website at Drexel University
 Imperial County Airport, California (by IATA airport code)
 International Programme on Landslides, a global cooperation programme of the International Consortium on Landslides

See also